The title babu, also spelled baboo, is used in the Indian subcontinent as a sign of respect towards men. In some cultures, the term "babu" is a term of endearment for a loved one as well. The honorific "ji" is sometimes added as a suffix to create the double honorific "babuji", which in northern and eastern parts of India is a term of respect for one's father. "Babu" can also be used as a term of respect for any respected elder or man.

In some Indian Zamindari estates the title Babu or Sri was used by its rulers. In many kingdoms the members of royal family and kin of the kings also used this title.

In Bangla and Maithili, "babu" is used as a suffix to a person's name to show respect while calling him by name, for example, "Mohan babu, could you please come here?". In Bengal, the word Babu or Babushona is used more broadly, meaning baby or a little kid or one's child, especially to younger kids. In the Saurashtra language, babu may refer to a younger brother, male, (sibling). The term "babu" may be suffixed to a person's name for example, Rose babu to refer to someone called Rose but the term "babuji" is always used by itself.

Civil servants

In British India, baboo often referred to a native Indian clerk. The word was originally used as a term of respect attached to a proper name, the equivalent of "mister", and "babuji" was used in many parts to mean "sir" as an address of a gentleman; their life-style was also called "baboo culture" often also humorously appealed as "babuism". The British coined the word "baboo" as a derogatory word because some Indians tried to copy them. Baboos (baboons) enjoyed a number of privileges for being in the service of the British Raj. The British officials treated baboos as workers who had both Indian and British connections. Since the mid-20th century, the term babu is frequently used pejoratively to refer to bureaucrats of Indian Administrative Service (IAS) and other government officials, especially by the Indian media, while the Indian bureaucracy is called "babudom", as in the "rule of babus", especially in India's media.

Other uses
"Babu" in Swahili is like "papu" in Greek. It is cognate with "baba" in Slavic languages, and ultimately with "papa" in Germanic and Romance languages. In Nepali, Eastern Hindi/Bihari, Bhojpuri, Maithili, Bengali, Telugu, and Oriya languages, it is a means of calling with love and affection to spouses or younger brothers, sons, grandsons etc. It can be found in the urban trend to call "babu" to girlfriends or boyfriends, or common-friends to symbolize deep love or dearness. In many Bengali families fathers and sons are usually named babu, as a matter of intimacy, with daughters or mothers.

On the island of Mauritius the word Babu-ji refers to the warrior community in Indo-Mauritian community. This community consists mainly of Bihari Mauritians, whose ancestors landed on the island as Coolies or indentured sugar cane field labourers during the 1810–1968 British colonial rule.

In Sicilian, babbu means a fool.

See also

Babu Saheb, regional title used in Bihar and neighbouring states.
Reddy (title)
Sahib
Effendi
Babuji (disambiguation)
Babu (disambiguation)

References

Titles in India
Titles in Pakistan
Titles in Bangladesh
Bengali words and phrases